The Figueiredo River is a river of Ceará state in eastern Brazil. It is a tributary of the Jaguaribe River.

See also
List of rivers of Ceará

References
Brazilian Ministry of Transport

Rivers of Ceará